Northern Argus may refer to any of:
 Northern Argus (Rockhampton), a former name (1863–1874) of The Evening News, Queensland
 The Northern Argus, published in Clare, South Australia since 1869
 The Northern Argus (Narrabri), published in Narrabri, New South Wales